Asura metamelas is a moth of the family Erebidae. It is found in Sri Lanka.

References

metamelas
Moths described in 1893
Moths of Sri Lanka